Radu Horia Niculescu (born 2 March 1975 in Sibiu) is a former Romanian football player. He played for European clubs such as Galatasaray, Steaua București, Dinamo Bucharest, Universitatea Craiova, FC National Bucharest and Rapid Bucharest.

Honours

Romanian League: 2000–01
Turkish Super League: 2001–02

International career

Niculescu won 14 caps for Romania, scoring twice, between 1994 and 2000. He played at the 1998 FIFA World Cup as a substitute against Colombia and Croatia.

Career statistics

International goals

Notes

External links
 
 

1975 births
Living people
Sportspeople from Sibiu
Romanian footballers
Romania international footballers
Romanian expatriate footballers
1998 FIFA World Cup players
FC Inter Sibiu players
FC Progresul București players
FC Steaua București players
FC Rapid București players
FC Dinamo București players
FC U Craiova 1948 players
Galatasaray S.K. footballers
MKE Ankaragücü footballers
Changchun Yatai F.C. players
China League One players
Association football forwards
Süper Lig players
Liga I players
Expatriate footballers in China
Expatriate footballers in Turkey
Romanian expatriate sportspeople in China